Mian Sheheryar (1928 – 9 January 2011) was a Pakistani television and film music composer.

Early life and career
Mian Sheheryar was born in Lahore, Punjab, British India in 1928. After completing his basic education, he obtained a master's degree from the University of the Punjab, Lahore. He started his career with Radio Pakistan, Lahore as a singer in 1948. In 1954, he recorded some of his compositions with His Master's Voice (HMV) label. Then he worked with some well-known musicians of that time including Niaz Hussain Shami, Sharif Ghaznavi, Ustad Sardar Khan and Feroz Nizami.

He joined the Pakistani television at its Lahore center since its inception in 1964, stayed with it and worked there for over 40 years until his death in 2011. He is credited with introducing many singers – Naseem Begum (only on PTV - Ghulam Ahmed Chishti had already introduced her in film Guddi Gudda (1956)), classical music and ghazal singer Hamid Ali Khan, Irene Perveen, folk singer Iqbal Bahu, Shabnam Majeed and Hadiqa Kiani. All these singers he introduced, as we know now, achieved success later in the Pakistani film industry and television.

Some of the Pakistani folk singers he helped develop their career include Suraiya Khanum and Tarannum Naz.

Some of his music assistants that had worked with him at the PTV television center at Lahore, later became accomplished composers themselves - for example his former harmonium player Rafiq Hussain who later became a music composer himself but has died in September 2020.

Popular compositions

Awards and recognition
 Pride of Performance Award by the President of Pakistan in 1992.

Death and legacy
Mian Sheheryar died in his hometown Lahore, Pakistan at the Shalamar Hospital on 9 January 2011 at the age of 84. Some of his PTV colleagues including PTV's Lahore general Manager Farrukh Bashir, former PTV producer Mushtaq Sufi and music critic/newspaper columnist Amjad Parvez attended his funeral. 

An event was held at the Punjab Institute of Language, Art and Culture (PILAC) in February 2011 to pay tribute to the memory of music composer Mian Sheheryar where the noted playwright and writer Mustansar Hussain Tarar, Amjad Parvez, PILAC Director Sughra Sadaf and Pakistan Television Corporation Deputy Managing Director Shahid Nadeem highlighted his contributions to the music of Pakistan.

References

External links
Mian Sheheryar on Apple Music website
TV Hits - Tahira Syed with Mian Sheheryar as music composer - on EMI Pakistan website
Qaseeda Burda Sharif composed by Mian Sheheryar on dailymotion.com website

1928 births
2011 deaths
Musicians from Lahore
Radio personalities from Lahore
Pakistani composers
Pakistani television people
Recipients of the Pride of Performance